Misia Candle Night 2014 was a concert tour by Japanese singer Misia and the third installment of the Misia Candle Night concert series. The tour began on August 23, 2014, at the Sapporo Art Park in Sapporo, Hokkaido and concluded on September 13, 2014, at the Sanuki Theatron in Sanuki, Kagawa. An additional date was held on November 29, 2014, at the Nakagusuku Castle in Kitanakagusuku, Okinawa, as part of the World Heritage Theater project.

Background
On April 18, 2014, Misia announced she would be embarking on a five-date outdoor installment of the Misia Candle Night concert series scheduled to begin on August 9, 2014. On May 31, 2014, a page on the tour website was set up for fans to submit song requests for the tour. On July 20, 2014, ticket sales were opened to the general public. On August 6, 2014, it was announced that the first date of the tour would be cancelled because of the Halong typhoon. The concert was postponed to September 13, 2014. On October 1, 2014, a last date was announced, in participation with the World Heritage Project in Japan, to be held at a special outdoor stage neighboring the Nakagusuku Castle ruins on November 29, 2014. The concert was broadcast on Wowow's Prime channel on January 31, 2015, and later released as the video album Misia Candle Night at Okinawa on April 1, 2015.

Set list
This set list is representative of the concert on September 13, 2014. It does not represent all concerts for the duration of the tour.

"Re-Brain"
"Believe"
"Aoi Tsukikage" ("Blue Moonlight")
"Mahō o Kaketa no wa Kimi" ("You Put a Spell on Me")
"Miss You Always"
"Ai o Shiru Sekai" ("A World That Knows Love")
"Nemurenu Yoru wa Kimi no Sei"
"Life in Harmony"
"Toki ni wa Mukashi no Hanashi o" ("Once in a While, Talk of the Old Days") (Tokiko Kato cover)
"The Rose"
"Song for You"
"Sukoshi Zutsu Taisetsu ni"
"Shiawase o Forever"
"My Pride of Love"
"Boku wa Pegasus Kimi wa Polaris"
"Tsutsumikomu Yō ni..." (Acoustic version)
"One Day, One Life"
"Candle of Life"

Shows

Cancelled shows

Personnel
Band

 Misia – lead vocals
 Tohru Shigemi – keyboard
 Shūhei Yamaguchi – guitar
 Sokusai – bass
 Fuyu – drums
 Kaori Sawada - keyboard, backing vocals
 Hanah Spring - backing vocals
 Lyn - backing vocals
 Gen Ittetsu - strings
 Maki Cameroun - strings
 Mori Takuya - strings
 Yayoi Fujita - strings
 Shōko Miki - strings
 Chikako Nishimura - strings
 Toshiyuki Muranaka - strings
 Masami Horisawa - strings

References

External links
 

2014 concert tours
Misia concert tours
Concert tours of Japan